Clayton Fiscus (born July 11, 1936) was an American politician. He was a member of the Montana House of Representatives from the Billings, Montana area from 2013 to 2017. He was a member of the Republican party.

References

External links
 Clayton Fiscus at ourcampaigns.com

Living people
1936 births
Republican Party members of the Montana House of Representatives